Jacobus Albertus Wilhelmus "Jaap" Burger (20 August 1904 – 19 August 1986) was a Dutch politician of the Social Democratic Workers' Party (SDAP) and later co-founder of the Labour Party (PvdA) and jurist. He was granted the honorary title of Minister of State on 4 January 1975.

Early life and education
Burger attended a Gymnasium in Rotterdam from April 1917 until May 1923 and applied at the University of Amsterdam in July 1923 majoring in Law and obtaining an Bachelor of Laws degree in June 1925 before graduating with an Master of Laws degree in July 1929. Burger worked as a lawyer in Dordrecht from October 1929 until December 1942. On 10 May 1940 Nazi Germany invaded the Netherlands and the government fled to London to escape the German occupation. Burger joined the Dutch resistance against the German occupiers in August 1942. In January 1943 Burger escaped the German occupation to England. Burger worked as political advisor for Minister of Social Affairs Jan van den Tempel from February 1943 until August 1943.

Political career
Burger was appointed as Minister for Return Policy in the Cabinet Gerbrandy II by Queen Wilhelmina, taking office on 11 August 1943. Burger was appointed as Minister of the Interior following the resignation of Hendrik van Boeijen, taking office on 31 May 1944. On 27 January 1945 Burger was forced to resign by Prime Minister Pieter Sjoerds Gerbrandy following an impromptu remark during a radio address where he differentiated between "wrongful" Dutch civilians (foute Nederlanders) and Dutch civilians who made a mistake (Nederlanders die een fout hebben gemaakt) during the War, but because Prime Minister Gerbrandy did not discuss this with rest of the cabinet all Social Democratic Workers' Party cabinet members resigned in response and the cabinet continued to serve in a demissionary capacity.

Following the end of World War II Queen Wilhelmina ordered a Recall of Parliament and Burger was appointment as a Member of the House of Representatives taking the place of the deceased Theo van der Waerden, taking office on 20 November 1945 serving as a frontbencher and spokesperson for the Interior and the de facto Whip. On 9 February 1946 the Social Democratic Workers' Party (SDAP), the Free-thinking Democratic League (VDB) and the Christian Democratic Union (CDU) choose to merge in a political alliance to form the Labour Party (PvdA), with Burger as one of the co-founders he became one of the unofficial Deputy Leaders of the Labour Party. Burger also became active in the public sector and worked as media administrator for the public broadcaster VARA serving as Chairman of the Supervisory board from 12 February 1949 until 20 December 1966. After the Parliamentary leader of the Labour Party in the House of Representatives Marinus van der Goes van Naters announced he was stepping down as Parliamentary leader in the House of Representatives following a conflict with Prime Minister and Leader of the Labour Party Willem Drees the Labour Party leadership approached Leendert Antonie Donker as his successor but the day before he took office Parliamentary leader-designate Donker took a leave of absence for health reasons and the Labour Party leadership approached Burger as interim Parliamentary leader, serving from 16 January 1951 until 18 September 1951. After the election of 1952 Donker was appointed as Minister of Justice in the Cabinet Drees II and the Labour Party leadership approached Burger as Parliamentary leader, taking office on 2 September 1952. Burger also served as President of the Benelux Parliament from 1 January 1958 until 1 January 1959. On 11 December 1958 the Cabinet Drees III fell and incumbent Prime Minister and Leader of the Labour Party Drees announced his retirement from national politics and that he wouldn't stand for the election of 1959, the Labour Party leadership approached Burger as his successor, Burger accepted and became the Leader and one of the Lijsttrekkers, taking office on 22 December 1958. The Labour Party suffered a small loss, losing 2 seats and fell back as the second largest party and now had 48 seats in the House of Representatives. On 16 September 1962 Burger announced that he was stepping down as Leader and Parliamentary leader in the House of Representatives following increasing criticism on his leadership. Burger remained in active in national politics, he was elected as a Member of the Senate after the Senate election of 1963, taking office on 5 June 1963 serving as a frontbencher and spokesperson for Defence and deputy spokesperson for Foreign Affairs, European Affairs and NATO. Burger was selected as a Member of the European Parliament and dual served in those positions, taking office on 20 October 1966. After the Delegation leader of the Labour Party in the European Parliament Van der Goes van Naters resigned Burger was appointed as Delegation leader, taking office on 7 May 1967. Burger was nominated as a Member of the Council of State, serving from 1 October 1970 until 1 September 1979. After his retirement Burger occupied numerous seats as a nonprofit director for supervisory boards for several international non-governmental organizations and research institutes (International Institute of Social History, Transnational Institute, Royal Netherlands Historical Society, Netherlands Atlantic Association and the Rijksmuseum) and as an advocate and lobbyist for European integration, Benelux cooperation and serving on several commissions for the European Economic Community and state commissions on behalf of the Dutch government.

Decorations

References

External links

Official
  Mr. J.A.W. (Jaap) Burger Parlement & Politiek
  Mr. J.A.W. Burger (PvdA) Eerste Kamer der Staten-Generaal

 

1904 births
1986 deaths
Commanders of the Order of the Netherlands Lion
Dutch expatriates in Belgium
Dutch expatriates in England
Dutch lobbyists
Dutch members of the Dutch Reformed Church
Dutch nonprofit directors
Dutch nonprofit executives
Dutch officials of the European Union
Dutch public broadcasting administrators
Dutch political party founders
Dutch resistance members
Engelandvaarders
European Union lobbyists
Grand Crosses of the Order of the Crown (Belgium)
Grand Officiers of the Légion d'honneur
Grand Officers of the Order of Orange-Nassau
Labour Party (Netherlands) MEPs
Labour Party (Netherlands) politicians
Leaders of the Labour Party (Netherlands)
Members of the Council of State (Netherlands)
Members of the House of Representatives (Netherlands)
Members of the Senate (Netherlands)
MEPs for the Netherlands 1958–1979
Ministers of the Interior of the Netherlands
Ministers of State (Netherlands)
Ministers without portfolio of the Netherlands
People from Dordrecht
People from Moerdijk
Recipients of the Bronze Cross (Netherlands)
Recipients of the Order of the House of Orange
Recipients of the Resistance Memorial Cross
Social Democratic Workers' Party (Netherlands) politicians
University of Amsterdam alumni
20th-century Dutch civil servants
20th-century Dutch lawyers
20th-century Dutch jurists
20th-century Dutch politicians